Space Invaders Infinity Gene is a shoot 'em up game released as part of the Space Invaders franchise. The game blends the series classic characters and gameplay with the concept of evolution. The game was developed by Taito and distributed by Square Enix. The game was released for iOS on July 27, 2009, after first appearing on Japanese mobile phones, and was later released for Xbox Live Arcade and PlayStation Network in September 2010, and for Android in September 2011.

Gameplay
The game begins with the classic appearance of the original Space Invaders. However, this soon gives way to Charles Darwin's theory of evolution, setting the tone for the remainder of the game. At the start of the game, the ship features the general controls of being able to move left and right and shoot. However, by progressing through the game and earning 'genes', the game goes through evolution, introducing new aspects such as being able to move the ship in all directions. As the game progresses, evolutions unlock various features such as new weapon types, an increased life limit, as well as unlockable music and bonus stages. During the game, players can shoot down UFOs to release DNA which, when collected, increases the effectiveness of their selected weapon. The DNA will scatter if the player loses a life. Players can chain enemy kills to increase their score, and also perform 'Nagoya Attacks', in which the player can pass through certain enemy fire the moment it is launched.

The game has several modes. Normal Mode, which sees the player travelling through the game and evolving; Challenge Mode, which features 99 challenge stages; Bonus Mode, featuring levels that are unlocked by evolving; and Music Mode, in which levels are generated from music tracks found on the hard drive. The game features real-time ranking, showing players their current position on the leaderboards.

The XBLA and PSN versions have several additional features from the iOS version, including HD support and added weapon types.

Development
Space Invaders Infinity Gene was developed by Taito, with Reisuke Ishida as the director. Following the 30th anniversary of the original game, Taito challenged its employees to reinvent Space Invaders. Ishida—a fan of the Space Invaders series and shooting games—had primarily worked on Taito mobile phone games, such as Trance Pinball, a pinball game with musical elements. He handled Infinity Genes graphical design and applied an atmosphere similar to Trance Pinball. Realizing that younger generations may be familiar with the characters but not the gameplay, Ishida wanted to convey the evolution of Space Invaders and made that the game's theme. After deciding on the evolution theme, he researched evolution as a whole and integrated his findings into the game; stage names and terminology reference evolution. Ishida hoped that showcasing the evolution of the series from its original form to a modern one would increase interest in the shoot 'em up genre.

In designing the gameplay, Ishida felt that simply combining the classic elements of Space Invaders with newer ones from Trance Pinball would not resonate well with the current generation of games, and decided that updated visuals were necessary to successfully mix the elements. As a fan of rhythm games, he wanted to fuse the musical and visual aspects of the game and include direct interaction between the two—a general goal Ishida had since joining Taito around ten years prior. The development staff drew inspiration for the game's visual from music videos for techno songs. Ishida also drew inspiration from Metal Black, a 1991 Taito shooting game; he commented that the game has an "element of 'evolution' as well". Ishida avoided the  style of gameplay because he felt that it would have limited the game's audience. He believed that the intense difficulty of bullet hell games dissuaded beginners and wanted Infinity Gene to serve as an introductory shooting game. Instead, Ishida aimed to capture the "flashiness" of the genre in the game's visuals. To increase the "fun and exhilaration", he wanted the game to only look like it has extremely intense battles. The staff applied this to the different game modes, with an emphasis on the Music mode.

Soundtrack
The soundtrack was composed by Hirokazu Koshio, with extra tracks by Soundwave. The tracks are separated between Genetic, Adaptive, and Evolution. Genetic tracks are reminiscent of the older 8-bit arcade game, while Adaptive and Evolution tracks have a faster, fuller, more modern style.

Reception

The iOS iteration of the game has received critical acclaim. IGN gave the game a score of 8.7, praising its smooth controls and replay value. Eurogamer gave the game 9/10, calling it 'the crowning achievement' of the series. Destructoid gave the game a 9.5 score.

The HD version for Xbox Live Arcade and PlayStation Network has also received positive reviews. IGN gave this version a score of 8.0, calling it 'a package that's worth purchasing'. GameSpot also gave it 8.0, praising excellent level design. 1UP.com gave the game an A− rank.

References

External links
 
 
 
 
 
 

2009 video games
Android (operating system) games
IOS games
PlayStation 3 games
PlayStation Network games
Scrolling shooters
Space Invaders
Xbox 360 Live Arcade games
Taito games
Music video games
Music generated games
Video games with custom soundtrack support
Video games developed in Japan